Gorley Lynch is a hamlet in the civil parish of Gorley in the New Forest National Park of Hampshire, England. It is in the civil parish of Hyde. Its nearest town is Fordingbridge, which lies approximately 3.2 miles (4.7 km) north-west from the hamlet.

Hamlets in Hampshire